Six-ball (or sixball, 6 ball, 6-ball and other variant spellings) may refer to:

6 ball, the pool (pocket billiards) ball numbered "6" and colored green
6 ball, the pink snooker ball, worth 6 points, normally referred to as "the pink"
 Six-ball, a pocket billiards (pool) game, played with six object balls, of which the 6 ball  is the game-winning ball; it is a shortened form of nine-ball
 Six-red snooker, a shortened form of standard (15-red) snooker; sometimes incorrectly referred to as six-ball snooker
 6-ball, a six-dimensional -ball in mathematics